Alberto Fernández García (born 9 July 1999) is a Spanish professional footballer for CE Sabadell. Mainly an attacking midfielder, he can also play as a winger.

Club career
Born in Moratalla, Region of Murcia, Alberto joined Real Madrid's La Fábrica in 2013, from UD Almería. Promoted to the reserves ahead of the 2018–19 season, he made his senior debut on 26 August 2018 by playing the last 21 minutes in a 2–0 Segunda División B home defeat of UD Las Palmas Atlético.

Alberto scored his first senior goals on 17 February 2019, netting a brace in a 3–2 away win against CDA Navalcarnero. He finished the season with three goals in 31 appearances, but suffered a knee injury in May, eventually missing the promotion play-offs.

On 14 August 2019, despite being injured, Alberto was loaned to Segunda División newcomers CF Fuenlabrada, for one year. He made his professional debut on 2 February of the following year, coming on as a late substitute for Caye Quintana in a 0–1 home loss against Girona FC.

On 7 September 2020, he was loaned to UCAM Murcia for the 2020–21 season.

References

External links
Real Madrid profile

1999 births
Living people
Spanish footballers
Footballers from the Region of Murcia
Association football wingers
Association football midfielders
Segunda División players
Primera Federación players
Segunda División B players
Real Madrid Castilla footballers
CF Fuenlabrada footballers
UCAM Murcia CF players
Spain youth international footballers